The Robert Morris Colonials men's lacrosse team represents Robert Morris University in National Collegiate Athletic Association (NCAA) Division I men's lacrosse. The Colonials became a varsity program in 2005.

History
Robert Morris currently competes in the ASUN Conference and plays its home games at Joe Walton Stadium in the Pittsburgh suburb of Moon Township, Pennsylvania. RMU had been a member of the Northeast Conference (NEC) through the 2020 season, but left that league to join the Horizon League, which does not sponsor men's lacrosse. The Colonials then became an independent for the immediate future. Ultimately, their stint as an independent would only last one season; on February 5, 2021, RMU was unveiled as a member of the newly reinstated ASUN men's lacrosse league, which started play in the 2022 season.

In 2018, Robert Morris was the number one seed in the NEC year-end tournament, reaching the finals where they defeated Saint Joseph’s 9-8 to reach their first NCAA tournament in lacrosse.

Robert Morris is 105-125 over 16 Seasons, with 7 NEC Tournaments, 2 NEC Tournament titles, 1 ASUN Tournament title, 3 NCAA Tournaments and 1 NEC Regular-Season title.

Season Results
The following is a list of the Robert Morris results by season as an NCAA Division I program:

{| class="wikitable"

|- align="center"

†NCAA canceled 2020 collegiate activities due to the COVID-19 virus.

See also
Lacrosse in Pennsylvania

References

External links
 

College men's lacrosse teams in the United States
Lacrosse, men's
Lacrosse teams in Pennsylvania
1992 establishments in Pennsylvania
Lacrosse clubs established in 1992
ASUN Conference men's lacrosse